Ban Ruean is a village and tambon (subdistrict) of Pa Sang District, in Lamphun Province, Thailand. In 2005 it had a population of 4388 people. The tambon contains eight villages.

References

Tambon of Lamphun province
Populated places in Lamphun province